The Refuge Waterfowl Museum was located at 7059 Maddox Boulevard, Chincoteague, Virginia, United States.  The museum contained an extensive collection of wildfowl wood carvings by renowned decoy crafters.  The museum also exhibited murals, wildlife paintings and skipjack models.  The museum claimed "Cigar" Daisy as its resident carver.

After the death of its owner, on May 4th, 2013 the museum announced that it will close and sell its assets.

Notes

External links
Refuge Waterfowl Museum.  Webpage from Chincoteague Chamber of Commerce website.

Defunct museums in Virginia
Chincoteague, Virginia
Museums established in 1978
Museums in Accomack County, Virginia
Woodcarving
1978 establishments in Virginia
Museums disestablished in 2013
2013 disestablishments in Virginia